Dutch colonial architecture refers to the various style of Dutch architecture built across the Dutch Empire. Though most of the buildings were designed by Dutch architects and dictated by Western architectural styles, even the most ardent style-purists among architects could not escape the forces of context and culture. Dutch colonial architecture often is a result of climatological adaptations or the use of local building materials - and more importantly, the rich and diverse cultural contexts. In this hybridity lies the quality of these buildings. Architecture shows that the strict racial taxonomy of a colonial system could not be maintained.

Dutch colonial architecture is most visible in Indonesia (especially Java and Sumatra), the United States, South Asia, and South Africa. In Indonesia, formerly Dutch East Indies, colonial architecture was studied academically and had developed into a new tropical architecture form which emphasizes on conforming to the tropical climate of the Indies and not completely imitating the architectural language of the Dutch colonists.

In Indonesia 

Dutch colonial architecture in Indonesia were built across the archipelago that once was known as Dutch East Indies. Dutch colonial architecture in Indonesia is a unique cultural phenomenon. It is a mixture of Dutch colonial and Indonesian culture. It does not exist elsewhere, even in the other former colonized countries. The uniqueness of these buildings can be seen in their colonial relics. As a result, there are large number of colonial buildings concentrated in its cities. Plenty of old VOC era forts and warehouses are also scattered throughout the archipelago, particularly around Maluku Islands and Sulawesi. There are three Dutch colonial architectural styles: Old Indies Style, Indies Empire style, and New Indies Style.

In Americas

Suriname 
Suriname's capital, Paramaribo is a former Dutch colonial town from the 17th and 18th centuries planted on the northern coast of tropical South America. The original and highly characteristic street plan of the historic centre remains intact. Its buildings illustrate the gradual fusion of Dutch architectural influence with traditional local techniques and materials.

United States 

Developed from around 1630 with the arrival of Dutch colonists to New Amsterdam and the Hudson River Valley in what is now New York and in Bergen in what is now New Jersey. Initially the settlers built small, one room cottages with stone walls and steep roofs to allow a second floor loft. By 1670 or so, two-story gable-end homes were common in New Amsterdam.

Dutch Colonial Revival architecture 

Dutch Colonial is a style of domestic architecture, primarily characterized by gambrel roofs having curved eaves along the length of the house. Modern versions built in the early 20th century are more accurately referred to as "Dutch Colonial Revival", a subtype of the Colonial Revival style.

In South Asia

India 
The Dutch came to India in the early 17th century and their influence and dominance is seen most in Kerala, though they occupied other parts of the country, such as, some areas along the southern Coromandel Coast and Gujarat. However, it is in Kerala, especially Cochin that Dutch architecture finds it existence. On the eastern coast, Pulicat was the first settlement of Dutch India and till date is home to the Dutch cemetery visited by tourists.

Sri Lanka 

Many building from the Dutch Ceylon era could be found on the coastal parts of the island. For example, the old town of Galle and its fortifications built by the Dutch in the year 1663 make up a UNESCO World Heritage Site. Historic buildings, such as old churches, can be found in many Sri Lankan cities and towns.

In South Africa 

Dutch architecture are found mostly in the Western Cape of South Africa, but modern examples of the style have also been exported as far afield as Western Australia and New Zealand, typically on wine estates. The style was prominent in the early days (17th century) of the Cape Colony, and the name derives from the initial settlers of the Cape being primarily Dutch.

See also 

 Architecture of the Netherlands
 Dutch Colonial Revival architecture
 Colonial architecture of Indonesia
 Cape Dutch architecture
 List of Dutch colonial buildings in Sri Lanka

Other colonial architecture

 French colonial architecture
 Portuguese colonial architecture
 Spanish colonial architecture

References 

 
Colonial architecture
Architectural styles
Dutch Empire